Interstate 86 may refer to any of three unconnected Interstate Highways in the United States:

 Interstate 86 (Pennsylvania–New York)
 Interstate 86 (Idaho)
 Interstate 84 (Pennsylvania–Massachusetts), section east of East Hartford, Connecticut was formerly designated as Interstate 86

86